The Rutgers Scarlet Knights field hockey team is the intercollegiate field hockey program representing Rutgers University – New Brunswick, the main campus of Rutgers University. The school competes in the Big Ten Conference in Division I of the National Collegiate Athletic Association (NCAA), although it was previously a member of the Atlantic 10 Conference (A-10), the original Big East Conference, and the new Big East Conference. The Rutgers field hockey team plays its home games at the Bauer Track and Field/Field Hockey Complex on the university's Livingston Campus in Piscataway, New Jersey. Since the field hockey program was established in 1974, the Scarlet Knights have appeared in the NCAA tournament twice, placed runner-up in regular-season conference play three times, and finished second in a conference tournament twice. The team is currently coached by Meredith Civico.

History 
Field hockey has been a varsity sport at Rutgers University since 1974. Between 1988 and 1994, the Scarlet Knights competed in the Atlantic 10 Conference (A-10), while from 1995 to 2012 they were a member of the original Big East Conference, and in 2013 they played field hockey as an associate member of the new Big East Conference. Beginning with the 2014 season, Rutgers (along with Maryland) has joined the Big Ten Conference, expanding it to nine field hockey members. The team has twice appeared in the NCAA tournament, in 1984 and 1986, playing a total of four games. In 1984, Rutgers defeated Penn State in the first round before losing to Temple in the quarterfinals, while in 1986 it beat Pennsylvania in the first round before being eliminated by North Carolina in the quarterfinals. The Scarlet Knights' best regular-season conference performance has been second place, which it has accomplished three times, in 1993 as a member of the A-10, and in 1995 and 2000 as a member of the Big East. Rutgers has also made two appearances in conference tournament championship games, in the 1993 A-10 tournament and in the 1995 Big East tournament. In 1993, the Scarlet Knights lost the title game to Massachusetts, while in 1995 they were defeated by Syracuse.

Season-by-season results 

Season-by-season results through the end of the 2014 season

Awards and accolades

All-Americans

Individual honors through the end of the 2014 season

Stadium 
Rutgers has played its home games at the Bauer Track and Field/Field Hockey Complex since 2009. Dedicated in April 1996, the Bauer Track and Field complex was originally designed specifically for track and field. The complex is located on the university's Livingston Campus adjacent to the Louis Brown Athletic Center (formerly the Rutgers Athletic Center), which is the home of the Rutgers men's and women's basketball teams. The Bauer Track and Field complex has also played host to the Big East Conference Outdoor Track and Field Championships in 2004 and 2005. In 2009, the inner oval of the complex was adapted for field hockey play in preparation for use by the Scarlet Knights field hockey team. Among the adaptations to the complex was the installation of an AstroTurf 12 playing surface, which was chosen by Rutgers due to its playability, durability, and low maintenance costs.

See also
List of NCAA Division I field hockey programs

References

External links